Zdravko Kuzmanović (born 22 September 1987) is a Serbian footballer who plays as a defensive or central midfielder. He last played for FC Basel. He represented Serbia in the 2010 FIFA World Cup.

Early life
Born in Thun, Switzerland to a family of Bosnian Serbs expats (his father hails from a small village called Skugrić near Modriča, Bosnia and Herzegovina, SFR Yugoslavia), Kuzmanović continued the family tradition as both his father Ljubo and his grandfather played football for the lower league in Bosnia and Herzegovina at the local club in Gradačac – FK Zvijezda where he started his football career. Kuzmanović's father also played professionally in Berlin, before eventually ending his career at FC Thun of Switzerland, and continuing to live in the country.

Club career

Basel
Kuzmanović started his professional career at Basel, having played in the academy for Dürrenast and Young Boys before moving to Basel. 
He was promoted to first team in 2005–06 season and also played for Basel II at 1. Liga that season. Kuzmanović scored his first goals for Basel in the second round of the Swiss Cup, in a 6–1 win over BSC Old Boys. Kuzmanović scored two more goals later in the season. Following his good performance, he was reported by UEFA as one of the most interesting young players in Europe and was awarded with the Swiss Golden Player Award for season 2006.

The 2006–07 season started well for Kuzmanović. He established himself in the first team and scored his first league goal of the season on 13 August 2006, in a 4–1 win over Thun. By the first half of the 2006–07 season, Kuzmanović had made twenty–eight appearances and scored five times in all competitions.

ACF Fiorentina
In early 2007, Kuzmanović was approached by Palermo, but the negotiations with the Rosaneri stopped abruptly. On 30 January 2007, at the age of 19, he signed a four-and-a-half-year contract with ACF Fiorentina after learning its midfielder Marco Donadel would be away for about two months because of a calf injury. The move was controversial when Palermo president Maurizio Zamparini and sporting director Rino Foschi accused Fiorentina of 'misconduct' by describing their director of football Pantaleo Corvino as a 'jackal'. In response, Corvino said "better jackal than chicken" before reaffirming the correctness of his actions. In an interview for the club's official website years later, Kuzmanović explained how his move to Palermo fell through.

After being on the substitute bench for most of the matches, he played his first Serie A match for Fiorentina in a 5–1 win over against Torino on 4 March 2007. In his first half of the season at Fiorentina, Kuzmanović went on to make three more appearances.

In his first full season at Fiorentina, Kuzmanović managed to established himself in the first team and then scored his first goal for the club against Catania on 17 February 2008. In the UEFA Cup campaign knockout stage in the quarter final against Everton, Kuzmanović scored his first European goal in a 2–0 win in the first leg. In the second leg, Everton managed to catch up with a 2–0 win, resulting an extra time and the game played on the penalties, which Fiorentina won 4–2. Kuzmanović ended the 2007–08 season making forty–eight appearances and scoring two times in all competitions.

The following season,on 14 October 2008, Kuzmanović signed a contract with the club that would keep him until 2013. Kuzmanović ended the 2008–09 season, making forty–one appearances and scoring two times in all competitions.

During his time at the club, Kuzmanović went on to become an integral first team player for Fiorentina, notching up over 70 Serie A appearances and featuring in their successful European competition runs.

VfB Stuttgart
On 31 August 2009 on the transfer deadline, Kuzmanović signed a four-year contract with VfB Stuttgart worth £7million.

On 12 September 2009, Kuzmanović made his Stuttgart debut, playing 22 minutes, in a 3–1 loss against Hamburg. Kuzmanović also made his Champions League debut for Stuttgart in a 1–3 defeat at home to Sevilla on 20 October 2009 and later scored his first Champions League goal in the return leg when Sevilla and Stuttgart played a 1–1 draw. Then on 21 November 2009, Kuzmanović scored his first goal for Stuttgart in a 1–1 draw against Hertha BSC, but was sent–off later in the game. Kuzmanović established himself in the starting eleven, taking the first team place from Thomas Hitzlsperger and made thirty–four appearances and scoring five times in all competitions despite injury.

Kuzmanović managed to regain his first team place and started the 2010–11 season well when he scored his first goal of the season, in a 7–0 thrash victory over Borussia Mönchengladbach on 18 September 2010, Kuzmanović’s performance soon attracted interests from Serie A clubs, but he played down rumours of leaving Stuttgart, insisting he was happy to stay at Stuttgart. In the round of 64, the second leg in the Europa League campaign against Benfica, Kuzmanović received a straight red card in stoppage time, as Stuttgart would not only lose for the second time against them, but being eliminated from the Europa League campaign. The 2010–11 season saw Kuzmanović making forty-seven appearances and scoring eleven times in all competitions.

In the 2011–12 season, transfer speculation to sign Kuzmanović continued when English side Chelsea had their 23 million bid turned down. Kuzmanović started the season by making seven appearances, including his first goal of the season as Stuttgart won 3–0 against Hannover 96 on 10 September 2011 before suffering a hamstring injury, which caused him to miss two matches. He then returned in mid-October and scored on his return on 22 October 2011, in a 2–2 draw against Nürnberg. Kuzmanović finished the 2011–12 season, making twenty–nine appearances and scoring six times in all competitions.

In the 2012–13 season, Kuzmanović had featured less at the start of the season, having suffered a torn muscle in his right thigh. On 24 September 2012, it was announced that Kuzmanović expected to leave the club at the end of the 2012–13 season after there were contract talks between the player and the club. After that, he was often playing out of position, both in substitution and starts. In December 2012, Kuzmanović's relationship with the club turned sour and beyond repair when contract talks broke down.

Internazionale
On 31 January 2013, Kuzmanović moved to Italian side Internazionale for an undisclosed fee.

Kuzmanović made his Internazionale debut on 3 February 2013, where he made his first start and provided the only goal in the game for Internazionale, as they lost 3–1 to AS Siena. Kuzmanović went on to establish himself in the first team, making thirteen appearances for the club.

However, in the 2013–14 season, under the new management of Walter Mazzarri, Kuzmanović was deployed only sparingly and spent most of the season on the substitute bench. and injured, making fifteen appearances for the club. With lack of first team opportunities, Kuzmanović attracted interests from Roma, but stayed at the club, stating he was happy at the club.

Then in the 2014–15 season Roberto Mancini was hired as the new Inter coach and under his management, Kuzmanović played more frequently. Kuzmanović played a role in both legs of the Europa League Qualification Round when he provided two assists in both games against Stjarnan. It was not until 29 October 2014 when he made his first league appearance of the 2014–15 season and provided the assist in the only goal of the game, in a 1–0 win over Sampdoria. Though he was placed on a loan list in January, he was taken off after the transfer window closed. Kuzmanović suffered an injury that kept out for the month. He finished the 2014–15 season, making twenty–five appearances and scoring once.

Ahead of the 2015–16 season, Kuzmanović's future at Inter Milan became uncertain after being linked with a move to Serie A clubs and Watford.

Return to FC Basel

First season
On 30 June 2015, Kuzmanović returned to FC Basel on a five-year deal. Upon returning to Basel after spending eight-years away, Kuzmanović said he wanted to stay at Basel for the rest of his career. After the announcement of Matías Delgado's captaincy, Kuzmanović was appointed as the club's vice–captain, alongside Marek Suchý.

Kuzmanović made his Basel debut in the opening game of the season, where he came on as a substitute for Delgado in the 63rd minute, in a 2–1 win over Vaduz. Kuzmanović suffered an injury when he tore his muscle in his right thigh, in a 3–1 win over Thun on 12 August 2015 and was sidelined for four weeks. After his return to the first team, Kuzmanović struggled to regain his first team place, due to strong performance from Taulant Xhaka and Mohamed Elneny and his return to the club became questionable.

With his first team opportunities limited, Kuzmanović was linked with a move back to Serie A, with Genoa, Bologna and Sampdoria and was expected to leave the club in the January transfer window. Another factor to leave the club was a dispute with manager Urs Fischer.

Loan to Udinese
On 21 January 2016, Basel announced that they had loaned out Kuzmanović to Udinese until the end of the season. This came after Kuzmanović was given permission to leave the club's training camp to join Udinese.

Kuzmanović made his Udinese debut in a 0–0 draw against Lazio on 31 January 2016. Since his return, Kuzmanović became a first team regular in midfield position, which he enjoyed playing and went on to make sixteen appearances, for the club. Despite being rumoured to join Udinese on a permanent basis for 5 million euro, Kuzmanović returned to his parent club instead.

Loan to Málaga
On 30 June 2016, Kuzmanović was loaned to La Liga side Málaga for one year. He made his Málaga debut in the opening game of the season, coming on as a 71st-minute substitute for goalscorer Juanpi in a 1–1 home draw against CA Osasuna.

After loan
Under trainer Marcel Koller Basel won the Swiss Cup in the 2018–19 season. In the first round, Basel beat FC Montlingen 3–0, in the second round Echallens Région 7–2 and in the round of 16 Winterthur 1–0. In the quarter finals Sion were defeated 4–2 after extra time and in the semi finals Zürich were defeated 3–1. All these games were played away from home. The final was held on 19 May 2019 in the Stade de Suisse Wankdorf Bern against Thun. Striker Albian Ajeti scored the first goal, Fabian Frei the second for Basel, then Dejan Sorgić netted a goal for Thun, but the end result was 2–1 for Basel. Kuzmanović played in four cup games and scored a goal in the semi-final against Zürich.

On 12 June 2020 the club announced that the contract with Kuzmanovic would not be prolonged. Between the years 2005 to 2007 and again from 2015 to 2020 Kuzmanovic played a total of 131 games for Basel scoring a total of 12 goals. 62 of these games were in the Swiss Super League, 12 in the Swiss Cup, two in the Champions League, 14 in the UEFA Europa League and 41 were friendly games. He scored five goals in the domestic league, three in the domestic cup, two in the UEFA Cup and the other two were scored during the test games.

International career

In early 2007, Serbian FA began talks with him about the possibility of playing for the Serbian national team and he accepted the call up to the squad against Kazakhstan and Portugal in March 2007. He scored his first two goals for Serbia in the away game versus Belgium, but they weren't enough to get a point, since Serbia lost 3–2. Although Kuzmanović was born in Thun and played for Switzerland at youth level, he has decided to play for Serbia on the senior level, stating: "I'm Serbian and I want to give all for my country, it's a matter of what you feel in your heart and I must listen to it."

He played once at 2007 UEFA European Under-21 Football Championship qualifying for Switzerland U21 thus being ineligible to play for Serbia at the same campaign, which Serbia lost to the Netherlands in the final. He also played a friendly versus France U21 in February 2007 before he accepted the call-up from Serbia.

In the 2010 FIFA World Cup, Kuzmanović was among twenty–three players named in the Serbia squad for the World Cup. Then in a match between Serbia and Ghana, Kuzmanović conceded a penalty by handling the ball. Ghana scored and won the match 1–0. Despite this, Kuzmanović went on to appear in two more World Cup matches, though Serbia was eliminated in the group stage.

Career statistics

Club

International

International goals

|}

Honours

Basel
 Swiss Cup: 2018–19

References

External links

 
 Profile at Swiss FA 
 Zdravko Kuzmanović at reprezentacija.rs 
 
 

1987 births
Living people
People from Thun
Association football midfielders
Association football defenders
Serbian footballers
Serbian expatriate footballers
Serbia international footballers
Swiss men's footballers
Switzerland under-21 international footballers
FC Basel players
ACF Fiorentina players
VfB Stuttgart players
Inter Milan players
Udinese Calcio players
Málaga CF players
Swiss Super League players
Serie A players
Bundesliga players
La Liga players
Expatriate footballers in Italy
Expatriate footballers in Germany
Expatriate footballers in Spain
Swiss people of Serbian descent
Serbian people of Bosnia and Herzegovina descent
2010 FIFA World Cup players
Sportspeople from the canton of Bern